Pindra is one of three tehsils (sub-districts) in Varanasi district in the Indian state of Uttar Pradesh. Pindra is situated 24 kilometers from the city of Varanasi and has 424 villages.

History
Pindra Village /Town was first setteld during the rule of Mughal Emperor Shahjahan in year 1630, when the place became a jagir with the name Aslah and Mir Muhammad Khan a pathan from Yousufzai clan was given its charge. He also build a fort like structure or a soldier settlement also known as Aslah, Here  war wepons were made and sold so the place derived its name KolAslah. He also had some conflicts with Vikram Shah of Birkrampur because of which he was removed from the post. He was Burrid in his tomb located there, some inscription in Persian is written there talking about unity and peace between vikrampur and pindra. Know only some ruins of the old fort remain there. Later his descendents also made a mosque known as Badi Masjid of the village. A small population of Muslim Pathans live there who are mostly Mir Muhammad's descendents. During the period of Aurangzeb many Rajput, Brahmanfamilies setteld near pindra a place named as Ushra Shaheed, from were they scattered in different Hamlets. There was also a huge settlent in later years of Yadavs at a place named Ahiran. The first Rajput who settled there was Bariar Singh who became notable man of the pargana his daughter Gulab Kumari was married to Raja Balwant Singh of Banaras. The place remained in posetion of Bariar Singh's Family till 1799 when it was confesticated on account of the implication of Babu sheoparan singh in the rebellion of Nawab Wazir Ali of Awadh and bestowned on Maharaja Udit Narayan Singh. During Massacre of Benares. <ref{{https://archive.org/details/in.ernet.dli.2015.47993/page/n459/mode/1up}}</ref>

Demography

Pindra Tehsil has total population of 804,481. Out of this, 411,176 are male and 393,305 are female. The gender ratio in Pindra is 957 females per 1,000 males, which is higher than Uttar Pradesh's state average of 912 females per 1,000 males. As of 2011 census the main population of the town pindar had the area of 92.2 acres and had 2278 households. The Pindra village had a population of 15257 as of 2011 Census.

Climate

Location

Pindra is located 24 kilometers North-West of Varanasi, 287 kilometers South-East of the state capital of Lucknow, 269 kilometers West of Patna and 132 kilometers East of Allahabad.

Transportation

Pindra is connected to National Highway 56 and is also serviced by Indian Railways (Pindra Road railway station). Closest airport to Pindra is Varanasi airport, (5.5 kilometers and a part of Pindra Tehsil).

See also

Pindra (Assembly constituency)

Notes
 All demographic data is based on 2011 Census of India.

References 

Varanasi district
Tehsils of Uttar Pradesh